Events in the year 1930 in Vatican City.

Incumbents 
 Sovereign Pontiff (Pope): Pope Pius XI
 Cardinal Secretary of State: Pietro Gasparri (until 7 February), Eugenio Pacelli (since 9 February)
 Governor of Vatican City: Camillo Serafini

Events

January–June 
 Early February – Pope Pius XI "vigorously protests" in a letter addressed to the Soviet government against the persecution of religion in the Soviet Union, and asks the faithful throughout the world join him in praying for the end of the oppression.
 6 February – Pope Pius XI issues a Motu Proprio establishing the "historical section" of the sacred congregation of rites.
 7 February – Secretary of State Pietro Gasparri resigns from his position, prompting Pope Pius XI to appoint Cardinal Eugenio Pacelli as the new Secretary of State.
 25 March – SoS Cardinal Pacelli becomes the archpriest of St. Peter's Basilica.

July–December 
 15 July
 The quadrennial Marian Congress takes place in Lourdes, France, with Cardinal Jean Verdier serving as the Pope's Papal legate.
 The National Congress of Prayer's Apostolate takes place in Braga, Portugal, with Cardinal Manuel Gonçalves Cerejeira serving as the Pope's Papal legate.
 24 December – Pope Pius XI holds the Vatican's annual Christmas address in the Consistorial Hall in the Apostolic Palace.
 31 December – Pope Pius XI publishes the Casti connubii, which condemns neo-paganism and supports the formal emancipation of women.

Unspecified date 
 Early 1930 – The official english translation of the Pope Pius XI's encyclical on education is released.
 1930–1933 – SoS Cardinal Eugenio Pacelli makes attempts to obtain a German a treaty for protection and continued rights of the Catholic Church and her Priests in the nation with the representatives of successive German governments, which turn out ultimately unsuccessful.

Deaths 
There were no deaths in the year 1931 in Vatican City, and there would not be until the year 1961.

See also 

 Roman Catholic Church
 City states

References 

 
Vatican City
Vatican City
1930s in Vatican City
Years of the 20th century in Vatican City